The 1872 Melbourne Cup was a two-mile handicap horse race which took place on Thursday, 7 November 1872.

This year was the twelfth running of the Melbourne Cup. It was the fourth Melbourne Cup win for owner and trainer John Tait.

This is the list of placegetters for the 1872 Melbourne Cup.

See also

 Melbourne Cup
 List of Melbourne Cup winners
 Victoria Racing Club

References

External links
1872 Melbourne Cup footyjumpers.com

1872
Melbourne Cup
Melbourne Cup
19th century in Melbourne
1870s in Melbourne